Keels may refer to:

 Keels, Newfoundland and Labrador, Canada
 Paul Keels (21st century), play-by-play radio sports announcer
 Trevor Keels (born 2003), American basketball player

See also

 Keel (disambiguation)